Stade Plabennécois Football (commonly referred to as simply Plabennec) is a French association football club based in the commune of Plabennec. The club was founded in 1934 and achieved promotion to the Championnat National after winning its group in the 2008–09 edition of the Championnat de France amateur.  The team was relegated to the CFA after they finished 19th in the 2010–11 Championnat National season. Since then they have been promoted and relegated between the fourth and fifth tier division on a number of occasions, and as of the 2022–23 season play in Championnat National 3.

Plabennec plays its home matches at the Stade de Kervéguen located within the city.

Players

Current squad

Notable former players 
For a list of former Plabennec players, see :Category:Stade Plabennécois players.

Honours 
 Division d'Honneur (Brittany): 1993
 Coupe de Bretagne runners-up: 1993

External links 

 
Association football clubs established in 1934
1934 establishments in France
Sport in Finistère
Football clubs in Brittany